Bullhead may refer to:

Fish
 Certain sculpins, including:
 European bullhead, Cottus gobio
 Siberian bullhead, Cottus poecilopus
 Norway bullhead, Taurulus Liljeborgi
 Japanese fluvial sculpin or Japanese bullhead, Cottus pollux
 Catfish of the genus Ameiurus, including:
 Black bullhead, Ameiurus melas
 Brown bullhead, Ameiurus nebulosus
 Yellow bullhead, Ameiurus natalis
 Catfish of the genus Pseudobagrus, including:
 Dianchi bullhead, Pseudobagrus medianalis
 Korean bullhead, Tachysurus fulvidraco (syn. Pseudobagrus fulvidraco)
 Black bullhead, Pseudobagrus koreanus; see 
 Other catfish, including:
 African bullhead, Lophiobagrus cyclurus
 King's bullhead, Liobagrus kingi
 Bullhead sharks
 Bullhead triplefin, Trianectes bucephalus
 Bullhead minnow, Pimephales vigilax

Places
 Bullhead City, Arizona
 Bullhead, South Dakota
 Bullhead Dam, on the Colorado River between Arizona and Nevada

Other uses
 Bullhead (album), by the Melvins
 Bullhead (film), a 2011 Belgian film by Michaël R. Roskam with Matthias Schoenaerts
 Bullhead rail, a particular cross-section of rail used in railway track construction
 The Bull's Head (Barnes), a London music venue formed in 1959 as a jazz club
 Bullheading, placing a column of heavy fluid into a well bore to prevent the flow of reservoir fluids from the well
 Tamiya Bullhead, a toy
 USS Bullhead (SS-332), the last US Navy ship sunk by enemy action during World War II
 Nexus 5X, an Android device with the codename bullhead